Abacetus aeneocordatus is a species of ground beetle in the subfamily Pterostichinae. It was described by Straneo in 1940 and is found in Cote d'Ivoire, Africa.

References

aeneocordatus
Beetles described in 1940
Insects of West Africa